Edgardo Berdeguer (born 29 January 1954) is a Puerto Rican archer. He competed in the men's individual event at the 1976 Summer Olympics.

References

1954 births
Living people
Puerto Rican male archers
Olympic archers of Puerto Rico
Archers at the 1976 Summer Olympics
Place of birth missing (living people)